The Gold is a British television miniseries written by Neil Forsyth and produced by his Tannadice Pictures. It stars Hugh Bonneville, Dominic Cooper, Charlotte Spencer, Sean Harris and Jack Lowden and is centred on the Brink's-Mat robbery in 1983. It is directed by Aneil Karia and Lawrence Gough. The first episode was previewed at the BFI Southbank on 17 January, and aired on BBC One from 12 February 2023, with all episodes simultaneously available on BBC iPlayer. It is due to stream on Paramount+ later in 2023.

Synopsis
The series covers the 1983 Brink's-Mat robbery in which £26 million (equivalent to £ in ) worth of gold bullion, diamonds, and cash was stolen from a warehouse near Heathrow Airport. At the time it was the biggest robbery in history.

Cast
 Hugh Bonneville as DCI Brian Boyce 
 Dominic Cooper as Edwyn Cooper 
 Charlotte Spencer as Nicki Jennings
 Jack Lowden as Kenneth Noye
 Tom Cullen as John Palmer
 Emun Elliott as Tony Brightwell
 Sean Harris as Gordon Parry 
 Ellora Torchia as Sienna Rose
 Stefanie Martini as Marnie Palmer
 Daniel Ings as Archie Osbourne 
 James Nelson-Joyce as Brian Reader 
 Sophia La Porta as Kathleen Meacock 
 Dorothy Atkinson as Jeannie Savage 
 Adam Nagaitis as Micky McAvoy 
 Hadley Fraser as DC John Fordham
 Silas Carson as Harry Carson
 Sean Gilder as DI Neville Carter 
 Nichola Burley as Brenda Noye 
 Amanda Drew as CS Cath McClean
 Chris Coghill as Neil Murphy 
 Ruth Bradley as Isabelle Cooper
 Peter Davison as Assistant Commissioner Gordan Stewart
 George Russo as Young Policeman Jack

Episodes

Production
The series was commissioned by the BBC in August 2021.  

The project was announced to have started principal photography in April 2022 with Bonneville, Lowden, Spencer, Cooper and Harris all revealed to be cast and Karia announced as director and Forsyth's Tannadice Pictures producing. Filming took place in the UK and Spain and locations included Dorchester Prison in July 2022.

Broadcast
The BBC released the first trailer for the show in on 20 January 2023. The first episode aired in the UK on BBC One on 12 February 2023 with all episodes immediately available on BBC iPlayer in UHD picture quality.

Reception
Hugo Rifkind of The Times remarked of the series, "it's tremendous. I'm not sure there's been a drama like it in years".

Radio Times said it was "an intricately crafted crime drama". Euan Franklin of Culture Whisper said The Gold "proves that shows dealing in largely British matters are just as ambitious as prestige American television".

[[New Statesman|The New Statesman]] called it "outstandingly enjoyable TV", with the Evening Standard giving the series four stars and calling it "a truly smart British crime drama with a classic feel and a knockout cast". 

Ellen E Jones of The Guardian awarded the first episode four stars out of five, dubbing it an "ever-enjoyable ride". Nick Hilton of The Independent also gave it four stars, remarking the show was "a lively, creative piece of work from writer-creator Neil Forsyth, which bubbles away with the vigour of a red-hot crucible".

There was criticism of the sympathetic portrayal of Kenneth Noye from the family of the man he murdered and one of the police officers involved in his conviction.  

 Book 
Screenwriter Neil Forsyth co-wrote a book with Thomas Turner entitled The Gold: The real story behind Brink's-Mat: Britain's biggest heist and published by Penguin Random House, which had involved extensive interviews with some of the major characters involved. Forsyth commented on the morality of the story, saying they were not seeking "a black-and-white reading of it. No-one in the show is an out-and-out criminal living in a world dictated by criminality. They've got families and lives". Forsyth gives historical context and says, "Social mobility is an interesting aspect, because it was obviously a theme of the time in the 1980s. I think we examine that...Criminality is a tool which they're trying to use to achieve something".

See alsoThe Gold: The Inside Story'', a 2023 BBC documentary about the robbery

References

External links
 

2023 British television series debuts
2023 British television series endings
2020s British crime drama television series
2020s British television miniseries
BBC television dramas
English-language television shows
Television series set in 1983
Television shows filmed in the United Kingdom
Television shows filmed in England
Television shows set in London